was a general under the Sengoku period daimyō, and later shōgun, Tokugawa Ieyasu. He is regarded as one of the Four Guardians of the Tokugawa along with Honda Tadakatsu, Sakakibara Yasumasa, and Sakai Tadatsugu. He led the clan after the death of his foster mother, Ii Naotora. He married Tobai-in, Matsudaira Yasuchika's daughter and adopted daughter of Tokugawa Ieyasu.

Early life
Ii Naomasa was born in Hōda Village of Tōtōmi Province. His childhood name was Toramatsu (虎松) later Manchiyo (万千代). His family, like the Tokugawa, had originally been retainers of the Imagawa clan, but following the death of the clan's leader, Imagawa Yoshimoto, in the Battle of Okehazama (1560), confusion and general chaos ensued. Naomasa's father, Ii Naochika, was falsely convicted of treason by Yoshimoto's paranoid successor, Imagawa Ujizane, and was subsequently killed. 

Naomasa, then a very small child, was personally lucky to escape his father's fate. After many difficulties, Ii Naotora succeeded the Ii clan and acted as the guardian of Naomasa; she adopted Naomasa to later succeed her. When Ii Naotora began working with Tokugawa Ieyasu after visiting him in Hamamatsu, she sent Naomasa to his care.

Service under Ieyasu
Ii Naomasa joined the ranks of the Tokugawa clan in the mid-1570s, rising swiftly through the ranks to eventually become the master of a sizable holding in Ōmi Province, following the Battle of Sekigahara (1600). His court title was Hyōbu-dayū.

Naomasa distinguished military service against the Takeda clan, at Siege of Takatenjin (1581), and for killing ninja who had been sneaking in to the bedroom of Ieyasu.

Naomasa accompanied Ieyasu returned to Mikawa from Sakai, where he had been staying, crossing over Iga province, following the death of Oda Nobunaga at Honnoji Incident (1582).

Naomasa initially garnered mass attention at the Battle of Nagakute (1584), commanding around three thousand musketeers with distinction and defeating the forces led by Ikeda Tsuneoki. In the battle, Naomasa fought so valiantly that it elicited praise from Toyotomi Hideyoshi, who was on the opposing side. Following the battle, Hideyoshi's mother was sent to stay with Naomasa in genteel captivity, cementing an alliance between the Tokugawa and the Toyotomi. 

After Naomasa helped ensure victory during the siege of Odawara (1590) by breaching the castle walls and contributing to the Hōjō clan's surrender,  he was given Minowa Castle in Kōzuke and 120,000 koku, the largest amount of land owned by any of the Tokugawa retainers.

Naomasa's finest hour was to come at the Battle of Sekigahara, where his unit outpaced those of other generals such as Fukushima Masanori, drawing the "first blood" of that battle. However, as the fighting was dying down, Naomasa was shot and wounded by a stray bullet during his attempt to prevent Shimazu Yoshihiro's getaway, a wound from which he would never fully recover. The wound also prevented his personal involvement in quelling the last vestiges of the anti-Tokugawa faction in the coming months. According to legend, Naomasa was feared so much by his own men, that when he was critically wounded at Sekigahara, not a single one of them committed ritual seppuku, the act of honor killing to prevent a samurai from falling into enemy hands, out of fear of retaliation. As such, Naomasa was able to regain his composure and escape with his life.

The units Naomasa commanded on the battlefield were notable for being outfitted almost completely in blood-red armour for psychological impact, a tactic he adopted from Yamagata Masakage, one of Takeda Shingen's generals. As such, his unit became known as the "Red Demons of Ii", a nickname he shared. It has also been rumored, although never confirmed, that Naomasa would sometimes wear a "monkey mask" into battle, including at Sekigahara.

Death
Ii Naomasa's premature death in 1602 has been widely blamed on the wound he received at Sekigahara. Naomasa was highly regarded by Tokugawa Ieyasu, so it is no surprise that his sons Naotsugu and Naotaka succeeded him in his service and title. However, Naotsugu managed to anger Ieyasu by refusing to take part in his campaign to reduce the Toyotomi clan stronghold at Osaka. Nonetheless, the Ii remained influential in Japanese politics throughout the Edo period.

Legacy
In theater and other contemporary works, Naomasa is often characterized as the opposite of Ieyasu's other great general, Honda Tadakatsu. While both were fierce warriors of the Tokugawa, Tadakatsu survived countless battles without ever suffering an injury, while Naomasa is often depicted as enduring many battle wounds, but fighting through them.

Naomasa's sets of armour are all preserved within Hikone Castle and are accessible for viewing.

Family
 Foster Mother: Ii Naotora
 Father: Ii Naochika
 Mother: Okuyama Hiyo (d.1585)
 Wife: Tobai-in
 Concubine: Inbu Tokuemon’s daughter
 Children:
 Ii Naokatsu by Tobai-in
 Ii Naotaka by Inbu Tokuemon’s daughter
 Masako married Matsudaira Tadayoshi by Tobai-in
 Koan-in married Date Hidemune by Tobai-in

References

External links
 Ii family information (in Japanese)
 Painting and brief bio of Naomasa (in Japanese)
 Information on Naomasa, including images of his flag, battle standard, and armor (in Japanese)

|-

1560s births
1602 deaths
Naomasa
Daimyo
Deified Japanese people
Ii clan